Ilunga Kafila (born 1 April 1972) is a Congolese sprinter. He competed in the men's 4 × 400 metres relay at the 1992 Summer Olympics.

References

External links
 

1972 births
Living people
Athletes (track and field) at the 1992 Summer Olympics
Democratic Republic of the Congo male sprinters
Democratic Republic of the Congo male middle-distance runners
Olympic athletes of the Democratic Republic of the Congo
Place of birth missing (living people)
21st-century Democratic Republic of the Congo people